Jelski's black tyrant (Knipolegus signatus) is a species of bird in the family Tyrannidae. It is found from southern Ecuador to northwestern Argentina.  Its natural habitat is subtropical or tropical moist montane forests.  This and the plumbeous tyrant are sometimes considered conspecific, in which case, the bird is then usually referred to as the Andean tyrant.

References

Hosner, P. A. and R. G. Moyle. 2012. A molecular phylogeny of black-tyrants (Tyrannidae: Knipolegus) reveals strong geographic patterns and homoplasy in plumage and display behavior.  Auk 129: 156–167.
 

Jelski's black tyrant
Birds of the Peruvian Andes
Jelski's black tyrant
Jelski's black tyrant
Taxonomy articles created by Polbot